YBC may refer to:

Baie-Comeau Airport - IATA code
Yale Babylonian Collection
Yamagata Broadcasting Company
Yerevan Brandy Company
Yeshiva Boys Choir
Youth Business China